Tuomey is a surname. Notable people with the surname include:

John Tuomey (born 1954), architect
Michael Tuomey (1805–1857), American geologist
Michael Tuomey (politician), nineteenth-century New York City civil servant and politician

See also
O'Donnell & Tuomey, an architectural practice based in Dublin, Ireland